Murrill is a surname. Notable people with the surname include: 

 Herbert Murrill (1909–1952), English musician, composer, and organist
 William Murrill (1869–1957), American mycologist

See also
 Murrell (disambiguation)
 Murrills